Matthew Louis Shear (born October 10, 1984) is an American actor. He is known for playing the role of Tony in Noah Baumbach's Mistress America, opposite Greta Gerwig and Lola Kirke.

He plays Detective Lucius Isaacson on TNT's The Alienist, based on the novel of the same name by Caleb Carr. The historical drama premiered January 22, 2018 and was nominated for Outstanding Limited Series at the 70th Primetime Emmy Awards and Best Action-Thriller Television Series at the 44th Saturn Awards.

Life and career
Shear was born in New York City and graduated from St. John's College—Annapolis in 2008. His film career began the following year with a bit part in director Ang Lee's comedy-drama Taking Woodstock. He starred opposite Zosia Mamet in the 2017 Tribeca Film Festival feature, The Boy Downstairs, released to theatres on February 16, 2018, by FilmRise. He also appeared in Noah Baumbach's The Meyerowitz Stories (New and Selected) and Marriage Story.

His prior television appearances include the CBS police procedural drama NYC 22, the Hulu supernatural comedy series Deadbeat and the Peabody Award-winning web series Horace and Pete.

Filmography

References

External links
 

1984 births
Living people
American actors